The House of Puttkamer (also abbreviated to v. Puttkamer) belongs to a widely extended German noble family whose earliest ancestor is first recorded between 1257 and 1260 in Schlawe (Sławno), Farther Pomerania. While some of its branches have the title of Graf (count), others are entitled to the lesser Freiherr (baron). According to a widespread family tradition, many firstborn Puttkamer sons receive the first name of "Jesco". The branch of the family moved in the 16th century to Livonia and from there to the Polish-Lithuanian Commonwealth.

Persons 
 Georg Ludwig von Puttkamer (1715–1759), Prussian general killed at Battle of Kunersdorf
 Gertrud von Puttkamer (1881–1944), German erotic writer
 Jesco Carl Eugen von Puttkamer (1919–1987), Ambassador of the FRG to Tel Aviv, Stockholm, Lisbon & Belgrade. He was Ambassador to Israel at the time of the 1972 killings at the Munich summer Olympics.
 Jesco von Puttkamer (1933–2012), engineer and NASA manager
 Jesko von Puttkamer (1855–1917), German military chief and governor of German Cameroon from 1895 to 1907
 Johanna von Puttkamer, Prussian noblewoman, wife of Otto von Bismarck
 Karl-Jesko von Puttkamer (1900–1981), Rear Admiral and naval adjutant to Adolf Hitler
 Martin-Anton Freiherr von Puttkamer (1698–1782) Prussian Major-General
 Peter von Puttkamer (born 1962), documentary filmmaker
 Robert von Puttkamer (1828–1900), Prussian statesman

Notes

Literature 
 Otto Hupp: Münchener Kalender 1925. Verlagsanstalt München/Regensburg 1925.
 Ellinor von Puttkamer: Geschichte des Geschlechts von Puttkamer, Neustadt an der Aisch 1984, Deutsches Familienarchiv Band 83-85, 
Genealogisches Handbuch des Adels, Adelslexikon Band XI, Band 122 der Gesamtreihe, C. A. Starke Verlag, Limburg (Lahn) 2000,

External links 

 Homepage des Verbandes des Geschlechtes v.Puttkamer e.V. (German)

Puttkamer family
German noble families
Pomeranian nobility